Bushido Blade may refer to:

 Bushido Blade (video game), a 1997 3D fighting game developed by Light Weight
 Bushido Blade 2, a 1998 video game, the sequel to Bushido Blade
 The Bushido Blade, a 1981 American film about a stolen samurai sword